In the Land of the Head Hunters (also called In the Land of the War Canoes) is a 1914 silent film fictionalizing the world of the Kwakwaka'wakw peoples of the Queen Charlotte Strait region of the Central Coast of British Columbia, Canada, written and directed by Edward S. Curtis and acted entirely by Kwakwaka'wakw native people.

The film was selected in 1999 for preservation in the US National Film Registry by the Library of Congress as being "culturally, historically, and aesthetically significant." It was the first feature-length film whose cast was composed entirely of Native North Americans; the second, eight years later, was Robert Flaherty's Nanook of the North. Most of the film was shot on the Deer Island near Fort Rupert, British Columbia. It was the first feature film made in British Columbia, and is the oldest surviving feature film made in Canada.

Original release
Curtis had earlier experimented with multimedia. In 1911 he created a stage show with slides, a lecture, and live musical accompaniment, called The Indian Picture Opera. He used stereopticon projectors, where two projectors dissolved back and forth between images. This was his prelude to entering the motion picture era.

The film opened in New York City and Seattle, Washington in December 1914, with live performances of a score by John J. Braham, had access to wax cylinder recordings of Kwakwaka'wakw music, and the promotional campaign at the time suggested that his score was based on these; in fact, there were few snatches of Kwakwaka'wakw music in the score. Curtis hoped the film would be successful enough to fund the completion of The North American Indian, a multi-volume history of every indigenous tribe on the continent he had been working on since 1906. Although critically praised, the film was a commercial failure. Curtis spent approximately $75,000 to make the film, but it only earned $3,269.18 after a year in theaters. He was so disappointed with the film's financial performance that he sold all the rights to the film to the New York Museum of Natural History in 1919 or 1920. When the museum lost Curtis's donated material, the film was considered lost until 1947.

Salvaging the film and score
A single damaged, incomplete print of the film was salvaged from a dumpster by film collector Hugo Zeiter of Danville Illinois and donated to Chicago's Field Museum of Natural History in 1947. Bill Holm and George Quimby obtained a 16mm copy in 1965 and completed a re-edited version of the film in 1974, having added a soundtrack by Kwakwaka'wakw musicians, and released the result as In the Land of the War Canoes. Independently, some other damaged clips from the film made their way to the UCLA Film and Television Archive. The score had been filed at the library of the Getty Research Institute, but without a title that tied it to the film. The 2008 restoration brought together these materials. Milestone Films has announced plans to release a restored "One-Hundredth Anniversary" DVD of the film with the original score in 2014.

Documentary or melodrama?
In the Land of the Head Hunters has often been discussed as a flawed documentary film. The film combines many accurate representations of aspects of Kwakwaka'wakw culture, art, and technology from the era in which it was made with a melodramatic plot based on practices that either dated from long before the first contact of the Kwakwaka'wakw with people of European descent or were entirely fictional. Curtis appears never to have specifically presented the film as a documentary, but he also never specifically called it a work of fiction.

Some aspects of the film do have documentary accuracy: the artwork, the ceremonial dances, the clothing, the architecture of the buildings, and the construction of the dugout, or a war canoe reflected Kwakwaka'wakw culture. Other aspects of the film were based on the Kwakwaka'wakw's orally transmitted traditions or on aspects of other neighboring cultures. The film also accurately portrays Kwakwaka'wakw rituals that were, at the time, prohibited by Canada's potlatch prohibition, enacted in 1884 and not rescinded until 1951.

However, as is noted by the producers who supervised the centennial restoration of the film,

Plot
The following plot synopsis was published in conjunction with a 1915 showing of the film at Carnegie Hall:

Cast

See also
Dances of the Kwakiutl (1951), short documentary

Notes

External links

In the Land of the Head Hunters essay by Brad Evans and Aaron Glass at National Film Registry 
In the Land of the Head Hunters essay by Daniel Eagan in America's Film Legacy: The Authoritative Guide to the Landmark Movies in the National Film Registry, A&C Black, 2010 , pages 37–39 

Edward Curtis meets the Kwakwaka'wakw: "In the Land of the Head Hunters"
Book version of In the Land of the Head Hunters (published 1915; now in public domain). PDF scanned from a copy in the Bancroft Library of the University of California, Berkeley.
In the Land of the Head Hunters: Film Introduction and Panel Simon Fraser University - YouTube

1914 films
United States National Film Registry films
American black-and-white films
American silent feature films
World Film Company films
1914 drama films
Headhunting accounts and studies
Kwakwaka'wakw
First Nations films
First Nations history in British Columbia
Films set in British Columbia
Films shot in British Columbia
Articles containing video clips
Silent American drama films
1910s American films